Awaous is a genus of fish in the family Gobiidae, the gobies. They are native to fresh, marine and brackish waters from Africa to the Americas.

Species
There are currently 19 recognized species in this genus:
 Awaous acritosus Watson, 1994 (Roman nose goby)
 Awaous aeneofuscus (W. K. H. Peters, 1852) (Freshwater goby)
 Awaous banana (Valenciennes, 1837) (River goby)
 Awaous bustamantei (Greeff, 1882)
 Awaous commersoni (J. G. Schneider, 1801)
 Awaous flavus (Valenciennes, 1837)
 Awaous fluviatilis (Visweswara Rao, 1971)
 Awaous grammepomus (Bleeker, 1849) (Scribbled goby)
 Awaous guamensis (Valenciennes, 1837)
 Awaous lateristriga (A. H. A. Duméril, 1861) (West African freshwater goby)
 Awaous litturatus (Steindachner, 1861)
 Awaous macrorhynchus (Bleeker, 1867)
 Awaous melanocephalus (Bleeker, 1849) (Largesnout goby)
 Awaous nigripinnis (Valenciennes, 1837)
 Awaous ocellaris (Broussonet, 1782)
 Awaous pallidus (Valenciennes, 1837)
 Awaous personatus (Bleeker, 1849)
 Awaous stamineus (Eydoux & Souleyet, 1850)
 Awaous tajasica (M. H. C. Lichtenstein, 1822) (Sand fish)

References

 
Gobionellinae
Taxonomy articles created by Polbot